This is a list of towns and villages in the ceremonial county of Cornwall, United Kingdom. The ceremonial county includes the unitary authorities of Cornwall and the Isles of Scilly.

In accordance with gazetteers, Cornish names are in the standard written form approved by the Maga signage panel.

For the civil parishes which often share the name of a village, see Civil parishes in Cornwall.

A

B

C

D

E

F 
Falmouth, Farms Common, Fenton Pits, Fentonadle, Feock, Fernsplatt, Fistral Beach, Fivelanes, Fletchersbridge, Flexbury, Flushing, Fonston, Forder, Forge, Forrabury, Foundry, Four Lanes, Fowey, Foxhole, Fraddam, Fraddon, Freathy, Frogmore, Frogpool, Frogwell

G 
Gam, Gang, Garker, Garras, Georgia, Germoe, Gerrans, Gilbert's Coombe, Gillan, Gloweth, Gluvian, Godolphin Cross, Godrevy, Golant, Golberdon, Goldsithney, Gollawater, Gonamena, Goon Gumpas, Goon Piper, Goonabarn, Goonbell, Goonhavern, Goonhusband, Goonlaze, Goonown, Goonvrea, Gooseham, Gooseham Mill, Gorran Churchtown, Gorran Haven, Gorran High Lanes, Gothers, Gracca, Grade, Grampound, Grampound Road, Great Bosullow, Great Tree, Great Work, Green Bottom, Greensplat, Greenwith Common, Grillis, Grimscott, Grumbla, Gulval, Gummow's Shop, Gunnislake, Gunwalloe, Gwallon, Gwavas, Gwavas, Gwedna, Gweek, Gwennap, Gwenter, Gwills, Gwinear, Gwinear Downs, Gwithian

H 
Halabezack, Halamanning, Hale Mills, Halgabron, Hallew, Hallworthy, Halsetown, Halton Barton, Halvosso, Halwin, Hannafore, Harcourt, Harlyn, Harlyn Bay, Harrowbarrow, Hatt, Hawker's Cove, Hay, Haye, Hayle, Heamoor, Helebridge, Helford, Helford Passage, Helland, Hellandbridge, Hellesveor, Helscott, Helston, Helston Water, Helstone, Hendra, Hendra Croft, Hendrabridge, Hendraburnick, Henwood, Herniss, Herodsfoot, Hersham, Hessenford, Hewas Water, Hick's Mill, High Cross, Constantine, High Cross, Truro, High Lanes, High Street, Higher Bal, Higher Boscaswell, Higher Condurrow, Higher Crackington, Higher Cransworth, Higher Downs, Higher Lank, Higher Menadew, Higher Penpol, Higher Porthpean, Higher Tolcarne, Higher Town, Higher Town (Scilly), Higher Tremarcoombe, Highercliff, Highertown, Highlanes, Highway, Hillhead, Holmbush, Holy Vale, Holywell, Hornick, Horningtops, Horsedowns, Hugh Town, Hugus

I 
Idless, Illand, Illogan, Illogan Highway, Inchs, Indian Queens, Insworke

J 
Jacobstow, Jolly's Bottom, Joppa

K 
Kea, Kehelland, Kelly, Kelly Bray, Kelly Rounds, Kelynack, Kennards House, Kenneggy, Kenneggy Downs, Kents, Kenwyn, Kerley Downs, Kerris, Kersbrook Cross, Kerthen Wood, Kestle, Kestle Mill, Keybridge, Kilhallon, Kilkhampton, Killaworgey, Killivose, Kingbeare, Kingsand, Knave go by, Knightor, Knightsmill, Kuggar, Kynance Cove

L 
Laddenvean, Ladock, Ladycross, Laity Moor, Lamanva, Lambourne, Lamellion, Lamledra, Lamorick, Lamorna, Lamorran, Landewednack, Landrake, Land's End, Landulph, Lane, Lane-end, Laneast, Lanescot, Langore, Lanhydrock, Lanivet, Lanjeth, Lanjew, Lank, Lanlivery, Lanner, Lanreath, Lansallos, Lanteglos-by-Camelford, Lanteglos-by-Fowey, Lanteglos Highway, Lantuel, Lantyan, Larrick, Latchbrook, Latchley, Launcells Cross, Launceston, Lavrean, Lawhitton, Leburnick, Leedstown, Lelant, Lelant Downs, Lellizzick, Lerryn, Lesnewth, Levalsa Meor, Lewannick, Lezant, Lezerea, Linkinhorne, Liskeard, Little Beside, Little Bosullow, Little Comfort, Little Petherick, Little Treviscoe, Lizard peninsula, Lizard, Lockengate, Lodge Hill, London Apprentice, Longdowns, Long Rock, Longships, Longstone (St Mabyn), Longstone (St Mary's), Looe, Looe Mills, Lostwithiel, Lower Amble, Lower Bodinnar, Lower Boscaswell, Lower Brynn, Lower Clicker, Lower Croan, Lower Lank, Lower Menadue, Lower Mill, Lower Penpol, Lower Porthpean, Lower Rose, Lower Town, Lower Trebullett, Lower Tregantle, Lower Woodley, Lower Woon, Lowertown (Luxulyan), Lowertown-by-Helston, Luckett, Ludgvan, Luxulyan, Lynstone

M 
Mabe Burnthouse, Maders, Madron, Maenporth, Maer, Malpas, Manaccan, Manhay, Manor Parsley, Marazanvose, Marazion, Marhamchurch, Marshgate, Maryfield, Maudlin, Mawgan, Mawgan Porth, Mawla, Mawnan, Mawnan Smith, Maxworthy, Mayon, Maypole, Meaver, Medlyn, Melinsey, Mellangoose, Mellingey, Mena, Menabilly, Menacuddle, Menadarva, Menagissey, Menheniot, Menherion, Menna, Merry Meeting, Merrymeet, Merther, Merther Lane, Metherell, Mevagissey, Michaelstow, Middle Crackington, Middle Penpol, Middle Taphouse, Middle Town (St Agnes), Middle Town (St Martin's), Middlehill, Middlewood, Milcombe, Millbrook, Millendreath, Millook, Millpool, Milltown (Cardinham), Milltown (Lanlivery), Mineshope, Mingoose, Minions, Mitchell, Mithian, Mithian Downs, Mixtow, Molinnis, Mongleath, Monkscross, Moorswater, Mornick, Morvah, Morval, Morwenstow, Mount, Mount Ambrose, Mount Hawke, Mount Hermon, Mount Misery, Mount Pleasant, Mountjoy, Mousehole, Muchlarnick, Mulberry, Mulfra, Mullion, Mullion Cove, Mylor, Mylor Bridge, Mylor Churchtown

N 
Nance, Nanceddan, Nancegollan, Nancemellin, Nancenoy, Nancledra, Nanpean, Nanquidno, Nansledan, Nanstallon, Nantithet, Narkurs, Navarino, Netherton, New Downs, New Grimsby, New Mill, New Mills, New Polzeath, Newbridge, Newlyn, Newport, Newquay, Newton, Newtown, Newtown-in-St Martin, Nine Maidens Downs, Ninnes, Ninnes Bridge, No Man's Land, Noonvares, Normandy, Norris Green, North Beer, North Corner, North Country, North Darley, North Hill, North Petherwin, North Tamerton, Northcott, Northward, Notter, Notter Bridge

O 
Old Cardinham Castle, Old Grimsby, Old Kea, Old Mill, Old Park, Old Town, Otterham, Otterham Down, Otterham Mill, Otterham Station

P 
Padstow, Palmersbridge, Pantersbridge, Par, Paramoor, Parc Erissey, Park Bottom, Parkengear, Parkfield, Paul, Paul's Green, Paynter's Cross, Paynter's Lane End, Pelistry, Pelynt, Pempwell, Penare, Penbeagle, Penberth, Penberth Cove, Pencarrow, Pencoys, Pencuke, Pendeen, Pendoggett, Pendrift, Penelewey, Pengegon, Pengelly, Pengersick, Pengold, Pengover Green, Penhale, Penhale Jakes, Penhallam, Penhallick, Penhallow, Penhallym, Penhalurick, Penhalvean, Penmarth, Penmayne, Pennance, Pennytinney, Penpethy, Penpillick, Penpol, Penpoll, Penponds, Penpont, Penrose, Penrose Hill, Penryn, Pensilva, Penstraze, Pentewan, Pentire, Penwartha, Penwartha Coombe, Penweathers, Penwithick, Penzance, Percuil, Perran Downs, Perran Wharf, Perranarworthal, Perrancoombe, Perranporth, Perranuthnoe, Perranwell, Perranwell Station, Perranzabuloe, Peterville, Petherwin Gate, Phillack, Philleigh, Piece, Pillaton, Pipers Pool, Pityme, Plaidy, Plain Street, Plain-an-Gwarry, Playing Place, Plusha, Plushabridge, Point, Polbathic, Polborder, Polbrock, Poldice, Polgear, Polgigga, Polgooth, Polkerris, Polladras, Polmarth, Polmassick, Polmear, Polmorla, Polpenwith, Polpeor, Polperro, Polruan, Poltesco, Polwheveral, Polyphant, Polzeath, Poniou, Ponjeravah, Ponsanooth, Ponsongath, Pont, Pool, Porkellis, Port Gaverne, Port Quin, Port Isaac, Porteath, Porth, Porth Kea, Porth Navas, Porthallow, Porthcothan, Porthcurno, Porthgwarra, Porthgwidden, Porthhallow, Porthilly, Porthleven, Porthloo, Porthmeor, Portholland, Porthoustock, Porthtowan, Portloe, Portlooe, Portmellon, Portreath, Portscatho, Portwrinkle, Poughill, Poundstock, Praa Sands, Praze-an-Beeble, Probus, Prospidnick, Prussia Cove, Puddle

Q 
Quethiock, Quintrell Downs, Quoit

R 
Radnor, Raginnis, Rame (in Maker-with-Rame), Rame (in Wendron), Readymoney Cove, Reawla, Red Post, Redmoor, Redruth, Redtye, Reen Manor, Rejerrah, Releath, Relubbus, Rescassa, Rescorla, Reskadinnick, Restronguet Passage, Resugga Green, Retallack, Retire, Rezare, Rilla Mill, Rillaton, Rinsey, Rinsey Croft, Rising Sun, Roche, Rock, Rockhead, Rocky Hill, Roscroggan, Rose, Rose-an-Grouse, Rosecare, Rosedinnick, Rosehill, Roseland, Rosemelling, Rosemergy, Rosenannon, Rosenithon, Rosevean, Rosevear, Rosevine, Rosewarne, Roseworthy, Roseworthy Barton, Roskear Croft, Roskorwell, Rosudgeon, Row, Ruan High Lanes, Ruan Lanihorne, Ruan Major, Ruan Minor, Rumford, Ruthernbridge, Ruthvoes

S 
Salem, Saltash, Sancreed, Sandplace, Sandylake, Saveock, Scarcewater, Scorrier, Scredda, Sea Mills, Seaton, Seaureaugh Moor, Sellan, Sennen, Sennen Cove, Seworgan, Sharptor, Sheffield, Sheviock, Shop, Shortacross, Shortlanesend, Shutta, Silverwell, Sithney, Sithney Common, Sithney Green, Skewes, Skinner's Bottom, Sladesbridge, Slaughterbridge, South Carne, South Hill, South Petherwin, South Pill, South Tehidy, South Treveneague, South Wheatley, Southcott, Southdown, Sparnon Gate, Splatt, Stenalees, Stencoose, Stennack, Stepaside, Stibb, Sticker, Stithians, Stoke Climsland, Stoptide, Stratton, Stursdon, Summercourt, Sweets, Sweetshouse

St 
St Agnes (Cornish mainland), St Agnes (Isles of Scilly), St Allen, St Ann's Chapel, St Anthony-in-Meneage, St Anthony in Roseland, St Austell, St Blazey, St Blazey Gate, St Breock, St Breward, St Buryan, St Cleer, St Clement, St Clether, St Columb Major, St Columb Minor, St Columb Road, St Day, St Dennis, St Dominick, St Endellion, St Enoder, St Erme, St Erney, St Erth, St Erth Praze, St Ervan, St Eval, St Ewe, St Gennys, St Germans, St Gluvias, St Hilary, St Issey, St Ive, St Ive Cross, St Ives, St Jidgey, St John, St Just in Penwith, St Just in Roseland, St Keverne, St Kew, St Kew Highway, St Keyne, St Lawrence, St Levan, St Mabyn, St Martin-by-Looe, St Martin-in-Meneage, St Mawes, St Mawgan, St Mellion, St Merryn, St Mewan, St Michael Caerhays, St Michael Penkevil, St Michael's Mount, St Minver, St Neot, St Newlyn East, St Pinnock, St Ruan, St Stephens by Saltash, St Stephens, St Teath, St Tudy, St Veep, St Wenn, St Winnow

T 
Talland, Talskiddy, Telegraph, Temple, Tencreek, Terras, The Towans, Thorne, Three Hammers, Three Holes Cross, Threemilestone, Threewaters, Thurdon, Tideford, Tideford Cross, Tilland, Timbrelham, Tintagel, Titson, Todpool, Tolborough, Tolcarne, Tolcarne Wartha, Toldish, Tolgullow, Tolgus Mount, Tolskithy, Tolvaddon Downs, Tomperrow, Torfrey, Torpoint, Towan, Towan Cross, Towednack, Townshend, Traboe, Tramagenna, Treal, Treamble, Treath, Treator, Trebarber, Trebartha, Trebarwith, Trebarwith Strand, Trebeath, Trebell Green, Trebetherick, Trebilcock, Trebudannon, Trebullett, Treburgett, Treburgie, Treburley, Treburrick, Trebyan, Treclago, Tredannick, Tredaule, Tredavoe, Tredethy, Tredinnick, Tredrizzick, Treen (in St Levan parish), Treen (in Zennor parish), Treesmill, Trefanny Hill, Treforda, Trefrize, Trefusis, Tregada, Tregadgwith, Tregadillett, Tregajorran, Tregamere, Tregardock, Tregargus, Tregarland, Tregarlandbridge, Tregarne, Tregarrick Mill, Tregaswith, Tregatillian, Tregatta, Tregavarah, Tregear, Tregeare, Tregellist, Tregeseal, Tregew, Tregidden, Tregirls, Tregirls beach, Tregolls, Tregona, Tregonce, Tregonetha, Tregonna, Tregonning, Tregony, Tregoodwell, Tregoose, Tregorden, Tregorrick, Tregoss, Tregreenwell, Tregrehan Mills, Tregue, Tregullon, Tregunna, Tregurrian, Tregurtha Downs, Trehan, Trehemborne, Trehunist, Trekeivesteps, Trekenner, Trekenning, Treknow, Trelan, Trelash, Trelassick, Treleigh, Trelew, Treligga, Trelights, Trelill, Trelion, Treliske, Trelissick, Treliver, Treloquithack, Trelowia, Trelowth, Tremail, Tremaine, Tremar, Trematon, Trematon Castle, Tremayne, Trembraze, Tremedda, Tremethick Cross, Tremore, Tremorebridge, Tremough, Trenance, Trenant, Trenarren, Trenay, Trencreek, Trencrom, Trendeal, Trenear, Treneglos, Trenerth, Trenean, Trenethick Barton Trengale, Trengume, Trenhorne, Treningle, Treninnick, Trenithon, Trenoon, Trenoweth, Trenoweth, Isles of Scilly, Trenwheal, Trequite, Trerair, Trerise, Trerose, Trerulefoot, Tresamble, Tresarrett, Tresavean, Tresawle, Tresawson, Trescoll, Trescowe, Tresean, Tresevern Croft, Tresillian, Tresinney, Treskerby, Treskillard, Treskilling, Treskinnick Cross, Treslothan, Tresmeer, Tresowes Green, Tresoweshill, Tresparrett, Tresparrett Posts, Treswithian, Treswithian Downs, Trethellan Water, Trethevy, Trethewell, Trethewey, Trethillick, Trethosa, Trethowel, Trethurgy, Trevadlock, Trevalga, Trevalgan, Trevance, Trevanger, Trevanson, Trevarrack, Trevarren, Trevarrian, Trevarrick, Trevarth, Treveal, Trevegean, Treveighan, Trevellas, Trevelmond, Trevelver, Trevemper, Treven, Trevena, Trevenen, Trevenen Bal, Trevenning, Treveor, Treverbyn, Treverva, Trevescan, Trevia, Trevigro, Trevilder, Trevilla, Trevilson, Trevine, Treviscoe, Treviskey, Trevithal, Trevoll, Trevone, Trevorrick, Trevowah, Trevowhan, Trew, Trewalder, Trewarmett, Trewartha, Trewassa, Treween, Trewellard, Trewen, Trewennack, Trewennan, Trewetha, Trewethen, Trewethern, Trewey, Trewhiddle, Trewidland, Trewindle, Trewinnion, Trewint, Trewithian, Trewithick, Trewollock, Trewoodloe, Trewoon, Treworga, Treworlas, Treworld, Trewornan, Treworrick, Treworthal, Treyarnon, Trezaise, Trezelah, Trillacott, Trispen, Troan, Trolver, Troon, Troswell, Truas, Truro, Truscott, Trussall, Truthan, Truthwall, Trythogga, Tubbs Mill, Tuckingmill (near Camborne), Tuckingmill (near St Breward), Tuelmenna, Turfdown, Tutwell, Twelveheads, Twelvewoods, Two Bridges, Two Burrows, Tywardreath, Tywardreath Highway

U 
United Downs, Uny Lelant, Upton, Upton Cross

V 
Valley Truckle, Varfell, Vellanoweth, Venterdon, Ventongimps, Ventonleague, Veryan, Victoria, Viscar, Vogue

W 
Wadebridge, Wainhouse Corner, Wall, Wanson, Warbstow, Warbstow Cross, Warleggan, Washaway, Watergate, Waterloo, Wearde, Week Green, Week St Mary, Welltown, Wendron, Wenfordbridge, Werrington, West Curry, West Downs, West Looe, West Pentire, West Taphouse, West Tolgus, West Watergate, West Youlstone, Westdowns, Wheal Alfred, Wheal Baddon, Wheal Busy, Wheal Coates, Wheal Frances, Wheal Kitty, Wheal Rose, Wherrytown, Whipsiderry, White Cross, Whitecross (Crowlas), Whitecross (Lanteglos), Whitecross (St Breock), Whitecross (Blisland), Whitemoor, Whitewell, Whitstone, Widegates, Widemouth Bay, Wilcove, Windmill, Windsor, Winnard's Perch, Withiel, Withielgoose, Woodford, Woolley, Woolston, Woon, Wringsdown

Y 
Yeolmbridge

Z 
Zelah, Zennor, Zoar

See also 
 List of settlements in Cornwall by population
 Places of interest in Cornwall
 List of farms in Cornwall
 List of topics related to Cornwall
 List of windmills in Cornwall
 List of civil parishes in Cornwall
 List of places in England

References

External links 
 Victorian Gazetteer of Cornwall
 An Index to the Historical Place Names of Cornwall

Places
Hamlets in Cornwall
Cornwall
Towns in Cornwall
Villages in Cornwall